Thomas Oswald Graham (12 May 1886 – 29 April 1933) was an Australian rules footballer who played with University in the Victorian Football League (VFL).

References

Sources
Holmesby, Russell & Main, Jim (2007). The Encyclopedia of AFL Footballers. 7th ed. Melbourne: Bas Publishing.

External links

1886 births
Australian rules footballers from Victoria (Australia)
University Football Club players
1933 deaths